{{DISPLAYTITLE:C2H3NO}}
The molecular formula C2H3NO (molar mass: 57.05 g/mol, exact mass: 57.0215 u) may refer to:

 Glycolonitrile, also called hydroacetolnitrile or formaldehyde cyanohydrin
 Methyl isocyanate (MIC)